{|

{{Infobox ship career
| Hide header=
| Ship country= Denmark
| Ship flag= 
| Ship name= Dronning Marie(Dronning Maria| Ship owner=  Royal Danish Navy
| Ship ordered=
| Ship builder= Royal Danish Naval Dockyard
| Ship original cost=
| Ship laid down=
| Ship launched= 16 September 1824
| Ship acquired=
| Ship commissioned= 
| Ship decommissioned= 1862
| Ship in service=
| Ship out of service=
| Ship renamed=
| Ship struck=
| Ship reinstated=
| Ship honours=
| Ship captured=
| Ship fate= 
| Ship status=
| Ship notes=
}}

|}HDMS Dronning Marie''' was a ship of the line of the Royal Danish Navy.

Construction and designDronning Marie was built at Nyholm to a design by Andreas Schifter.  Construction started in 1821 and was not completed until 1827. She was launched in 1824.Dronning Marie was 180 feet long, with a beam of 46 feet and a draught of 19 feet. Her complement was 771 men. Her initial gun armament was 84 30-pounder guns.

Naval career and fateDronning Marie was under the command of Ulrich  Anthon Schønheyder on her maiden journey in 1934. Rckersberg asked Harbour Master at Nyholm Søren Ludvig Tuxe for permission to participate on the ship's maiden voyage around Zealand. He and his friend Emil Normann boarded the ship on 5 July. On 7 July, in the Bay of  Sejrø, the two went off in a rowing boat to paint the vessel in the Great Belt. Rckersberg got off in Nyborg. Dronning Marie grounded south of Sprogø in 1834. The locality is now known as Dronning Marias Puller.

Lat4er the same year, Dronning Marie took Crown Prince Frederik (VII) to Iceland and the Faroe Islands. Other passengers of the ship on that voyage was the painter Theodor Kloss-

In 1849, she was converted into a 60-gun frigate.

After the Battle of Bov, in 1848,  Dronning Marie was for a while used as a prison ship in Copenhagen. In 1858, Dronning Marie was put into use as an accommodation ship at Nyholm. She was decommissioned in 1862. She existed until at least 1888.

Legacy
Christoffer Wilhelm Eckersberg has created an 1834 painting of Dronning Merie'' as well as an 1824 drawing of her under construction. She is also known from a number of other drawings and lithographs. Her figurehead was for many years installed as a monument at Holmen in Copenhagen. It has later been moved to Frederikshavn Naval Base in Frederikshavn.

Gallery

References

External links

1824 ships
Ships designed by Andreas Schifter
Ships built in Copenhagen